Saku Sporting is an Estonian sports club in Saku Parish with women's, men's and youth association football teams. The women's team currently plays in Naiste Meistriliiga, the first level in the Estonian women's football system. The men's team plays in III liiga.

History
The club was founded in 2007. In the beginning they worked with children and youngsters and in 2011 founded a senior team. Later, founded a women`s team.

In 2021, ladies took the second place in the national championship.

References

External links
Home page

Women's football clubs in Estonia
Saku Parish